David Ray Lewis (born October 16, 1945 in Clovis, California) is a former American football punter and quarterback for the National Football League's Cincinnati Bengals from 1970 to 1973.  He attended Stanford University and was drafted in the 5th round of the 1967 NFL Draft by the New York Giants. Lewis led the NFL in punting in 1970 and 1971. He also played three seasons for the Montreal Alouettes of the Canadian Football League.

External links
NFL.com player page

1945 births
Living people
Sportspeople from Clovis, California
American football punters
American football quarterbacks
Stanford Cardinal football players
Cincinnati Bengals players
Players of American football from California
Montreal Alouettes players
Canadian football punters